Transcription factor E3 is a protein that in humans is encoded by the TFE3 gene.

Function 

TFE3, a member of the helix-loop-helix family of transcription factors, binds to the mu-E3 motif of the immunoglobulin heavy-chain enhancer and is expressed in many cell types (Henthorn et al., 1991).[supplied by OMIM]

Interactions 

TFE3 has been shown to interact with:
 E2F3, 
 Microphthalmia-associated transcription factor, and
 Mothers against decapentaplegic homolog 3

Translocations
A proportion of renal carcinomas  (RCC) that occur in young patients are associated with translocations involving the TFE3 gene at chromosome Xp11.2 PRCC

References

Further reading